Hidden Valley Resort is a ski resort in the Laurel Highlands, near the village of Hidden Valley, Pennsylvania. In  2021, the resort was purchased by Vail Resorts, along with Seven Springs and Laurel Mountain.

References

Ski areas and resorts in Pennsylvania
Buildings and structures in Somerset County, Pennsylvania
Tourist attractions in Somerset County, Pennsylvania
Pittsburgh metropolitan area
Vail Resorts